"Capital Letters" is a song by American singer Hailee Steinfeld and American record producer BloodPop. It was written by Steinfeld, BloodPop, Raye, Andrew Jackson, Ellie Goulding and Ely Weisfeld, with production handled by BloodPop and Benjamin Rice. The song was released via Universal Studios and Republic Records on January 12, 2018, as the second single from the soundtrack to the film Fifty Shades Freed (2018).

Background
The song was first revealed when the track list of the soundtrack was released. On January 10, 2018, Steinfeld teased the song via Twitter with an audio preview.

Critical reception
Madeline Roth of MTV News wrote that the song features a "synthy dance beat" and felt it "lacks in raunchiness" and instead "makes up for with pure, high-flying emotion". Sam Damshenas of Gay Times opined that the song is "very romantic", calling it "a total banger". Monica Sisavat of PopSugar wrote that the song is "extremely sexy" and "will have you on your feet in a matter of seconds". Shaun Kitchener of Daily Express was disappointed as "it's not the much-hyped sing-song from Jamie Dornan", but still regarded the song as "a great pop nugget". Mike Wass of Idolator described the first two songs from the soundtrack album as "plodding bedroom anthems", deeming this song "a raunchy, club-ready anthem".

Credits and personnel
Credits adapted from Tidal.
 Hailee Steinfeld – vocals, songwriting
 BloodPop – songwriting, production
 Ben Rice – production, record engineering
 Andrew Jackson – songwriting
 Ellie Goulding – songwriting
 Ely Weisfeld – songwriting
 Raye – songwriting
 Pete Anthony – orchestra conducting
 David Buckley – orchestra conducting
 Serban Ghenea – mixing

Charts

Certifications

References

2018 singles
2018 songs
Hailee Steinfeld songs
BloodPop songs
Dance-pop songs
Fifty Shades film music
Music videos directed by Hannah Lux Davis
Song recordings produced by BloodPop
Songs written by BloodPop
Songs written by Ellie Goulding
Songs written by Hailee Steinfeld
Songs written by Raye (singer)
Song recordings produced by Ben Rice (producer)